Neoibidionini was a tribe of beetles in the subfamily Cerambycinae, but now normally placed in the Ibidionini.

It contained the following genera:
 Alcyopis
 Aneuthetochorus
 Aphatum
 Asynapteron
 Bomaribidion
 Brechmoidion
 Cecaibidion
 Cephaloplon
 Cicatrion
 Coleroidion
 Compsa
 Compsibidion
 Corimbion
 Cycnidolon
 Diasporidion
 Dodecaibidion
 Engyum
 Glomibidion
 Gnomibidion
 Hadroibidion
 Heterachthes
 Heterocompsa
 Homaloidion
 Hormathus
 Kolonibidion
 Kunaibidion
 Megaceron
 Megapedion
 Microibidion
 Minibidion
 Monzonia
 Neocompsa
 Neoctoplon
 Neoibidion
 Neopotiatuca
 Neotropidion
 Opacibidion
 Ophtalmibidion
 Opsibidion
 Palpibidion
 Paracompsa
 Perissomerus
 Phocibidion
 Prothoracibidion
 Psiloibidion
 Pubescibidion
 Pygmodeon
 Rhysium
 Smaragdion
 Stenoidion
 Sydax
 Tetraopidion
 Thoracibidion
 Trichoplon
 Tropidion
 Xalitla

References

 
Cerambycinae
Obsolete animal taxa